Matthew David Sadler (born 15 May 1974) is an English chess grandmaster, chess writer and two-time British Chess Champion. He is the No. 2 ranked English player

Personal life
Sadler has a French mother, speaks French perfectly and is also qualified to play in closed French events. He was tipped to reach the heights scaled by other leading English players as Michael Adams and Nigel Short but made the decision to cease playing professionally in his mid 20s, opting for an IT career in the Netherlands.

Chess career
Sadler won the British Championship in 1995 at the age of 21 and again in 1997 (jointly with Michael Adams). He represented England in the 1996 Chess Olympiad, scoring 10½/13 and winning a gold medal for the best score on board four (England finished fourth), and also played in 1998 scoring 7½/12. He made 7/9 on board four for England at the European Team Chess Championship in Pula in 1997. His was the best individual score of the five-man English team and so contributed significantly to England's first (and to date only) gold medal in a major competition.

For several years, he was the book reviewer for New in Chess magazine and also wrote books and articles for other chess magazines. In 2000, his book Queen's Gambit Declined (published by Everyman) was awarded the British Chess Federation's book of the year award.

Latterly a resident of Amersfoort, Sadler returned to chess in 2010 to play in a rapidplay tournament held in nearby Wageningen. He won the event with a perfect score of 7/7, finishing ahead of grandmasters Jan Timman, Friso Nijboer and Daniel Fridman. In August 2011, Sadler continued his resurgence by winning the XIII Open Internacional D'Escacs de Sants, scoring 8½/10, ahead of several grandmasters including Jan Smeets. Right thereafter, in October 2011, he went on to compete in the Oslo Chess International; participants included ten other grandmasters, among them Sergei Tiviakov, Jon Ludvig Hammer and Sergey Volkov, all being 2600+ rated. Sadler won convincingly, with 8/9 points and a performance rating of 2849. Going into 2012, the gain in rating points elevated him to fourth rank amongst active English players and also lifted him back into the World Top 100.

In a January 2012 interview, Sadler stated that chess was now primarily a "hobby" for him. While relishing his return to tournament play, Sadler noted that he was now an amateur, and would not be coming back as a professional.  He contrasts his present lighthearted attitude with his demeanor during his time as a professional, when he was "working ten hours a day and incredibly intensively".

Since 2019, Sadler has taken an interest in computer chess, especially AlphaZero and the Top Chess Engine Championship (TCEC), writing several books and news articles on the field: Game Changer, The Silicon Road to Chess Improvement and various articles in the New In Chess magazine.

Bibliography

References

External links
 
 
 
 
 
 
 

1974 births
Living people
Chess grandmasters
Chess Olympiad competitors
English chess players
English non-fiction writers
British chess writers
English male non-fiction writers